The 72nd Regiment of Foot (Invalids) was a British Army regiment raised from invalids for service in the Seven Years' War. The regiment was raised in Germany in 1757 as the 82nd Regiment of Foot (Invalids) by Major-General John Parker, who remained its colonel throughout its existence. It was re-numbered the 72nd Regiment of Foot (Invalids) in 1764 and disbanded in 1768.

References

Infantry regiments of the British Army
Military units and formations established in 1757
Military units and formations disestablished in 1768
1757 establishments in Great Britain